Gerald Jinx "Jerry" Mouse is a fictional character and one of the two titular characters in Metro-Goldwyn-Mayer's series of Tom and Jerry theatrical animated short films and other animated media, usually acting as the protagonist opposite his rival Tom Cat. Created by William Hanna and Joseph Barbera, Jerry is a cute young brown mute anthropomorphic house mouse, who first appeared as a mouse named Jinx in the 1940 MGM animated short Puss Gets the Boot. Hanna gave the mouse's original name as "Jinx", while Barbera claimed the mouse went unnamed in his first appearance.

History

Tom and Jerry cartoons
The name "Jerry" was chosen by Geraint Rowlands, who submitted "Tom and Jerry" as potential names for the duo after an important Loews Inc. distributor in Texas asked for follow-ups to Puss Gets the Boot. While the idea of a cat-and-mouse duo was considered shopworn by the 1940s, Hanna and Barbera decided to expand upon the standard expected cat and mouse relationship. Instead of being a "cowering victim" of Tom, he took delight in besting, and even torturing, his feline frenemy (even if Tom is just following orders or is even just minding his own business and is antagonized by Jerry). Hanna and Barbera considered Tom and Jerry "the best of enemies", whose rivalry hid an unspoken amount of mutual caring and respect for one another. Jerry is also mute, along with Tom.

In later Tom and Jerry cartoons, Jerry acquired a young ward: a small grey mouse called "Tuffy" or "Nibbles" depending upon the cartoon, who was left on Jerry's doorstep as a foundling baby in the 1946 short The Milky Waif. Jerry and Tuffy were also featured together in a sub-series of Tom and Jerry cartoons set in 17th century France which featured the characters as musketeers. The first of these shorts, The Two Mouseketeers, won the 1951 Academy Award for Best Short Subject: Cartoons.

Hanna and Barbera served as writer/directors of the Tom and Jerry cartoons until 1956, when they also became the producers. Fourteen Tom and Jerry cartoons between 1940 and 1954 were nominated for the Academy Award for Best Short Subject: Cartoons, with seven of the shorts winning that award. MGM shut down its animation department in 1957, but new Tom and Jerry cartoons were produced by Gene Deitch and later Chuck Jones during the 1960s. Jerry would also appear in later Tom and Jerry productions made for television, a series of direct-to-video features, and Tom and Jerry: The Movie, a 1992 theatrical film. Later productions eschewed much of the violence the 1940s and 1950s shorts were known for, and in several of the television shows Jerry was given a red bowtie and a kinder disposition in Tom & Jerry Kids.

Tom and Jerry aren't always enemies; they have been known to team up on occasion. The first Tom and Jerry short/film that Jerry was in is Puss Gets the Boot, and the last is The Karate Guard, the 163rd Tom and Jerry film. Jerry has been on the Tom and Jerry film series from 1940 to the present.

Anchors Aweigh
On his own, Jerry Mouse appears in a fantasy sequence in the 1945 Gene Kelly MGM musical film Anchors Aweigh. Jerry appears as the young ruler of a kingdom where music is banned because he feels he lacks talent, and Kelly persuades the mouse into performing a song-and-dance number with him. Kelly and MGM had originally wanted Walt Disney's Mickey Mouse as Kelly's dance partner for the sequence, but Disney was unwilling to license the character.

Hanna and Barbera achieved the effect of Kelly dancing with Jerry by rotoscoping: live-action plates of Kelly dancing alone were shot first, and the action traced frame by frame so that Jerry's movements would match. The success of the animated segment of Anchors Aweigh, which was mentioned as "stealing the show" in contemporary trade reviews, led to two more live-action/animated projects for Hanna and Barbera and MGM: an underwater ballet sequence featuring both Tom and Jerry in the 1953 film Dangerous When Wet, with Esther Williams, and the "Sinbad the Sailor" sequence of Kelly's 1956 film Invitation to the Dance.

Tom & Jerry Kids
In 1990, this version of Jerry wears a red bowtie (just like what he used to have in the 1975 Tom and Jerry Show) and has a tuft of hair on his head. He often taunts Tom (as a kitten) any chance he gets. Sometimes, in a few episodes, he is friends with/allies of Tom.

Voice actors
Bill Hanna: Vocal effects in the Hanna-Barbera era (1940–1958) shorts and speaking in Part-Time Pal, Tom and Jerry: Shiver Me Whiskers (archival recordings from classic shorts), The Tom and Jerry Show (2014, archival recordings from the pre-1958 shorts),  Tom & Jerry (2021, archival recordings as before) and Tom and Jerry Special Shorts (2021 series) (archival recordings as before)
 Harry Lang: vocal effects and speaking in The Lonesome Mouse, whistling and sneezing in Mouse in Manhattan
Kent Rogers: Fraidy Cat and Puss n' Toots vocal effects
Sara Berner: Baby Puss vocal effects, speaking in The Zoot Cat, speaking and singing voice for Jerry in Anchors Aweigh, screaming in The Tom and Jerry Show (2014 TV series) episode "Pranks for Nothing" (archive recording from Baby Puss)
Jerry Mann: The Million Dollar Cat vocal effects
Lillian Randolph (voice of Mammy Two Shoes): when Jerry and Tuffy disguise to fool Tom in the 1946 short: The Milky Waif
Frank Graham: speaking in Kitty Foiled
Georgia Stark: whistling in Kitty Foiled
Paul Frees: speaking in His Mouse Friday and Blue Cat Blues
Manuel Paris: speaking in Mucho Mouse
Allen Swift: vocal effects in the Gene Deitch era (1961–1962) shorts
 Gene Deitch: laughing in Buddies Thicker Than Water
Mel Blanc: vocal effects in the Chuck Jones era (1963–1967) shorts
Terence Monk: singing in The Cat Above and the Mouse Below
June Foray: vocal effects in the Chuck Jones era (1965–1967) shorts, Boomerang UK and Ireland bumper (archival recording from I'm Just Wild About Jerry)
Walker Edmiston: Mattel Tom and Jerry Talking Hand Puppet
Dale McKennon: singing in Cat and Dupli-cat
John Stephenson: The Tom and Jerry Show (1975)
Lou Scheimer: The Tom and Jerry Comedy Show
Frank W. Welker: vocal effects in Tom & Jerry Kids & Tom and Jerry: The Magic Ring
Dana Hill: speaking, non-speaking and singing in Tom and Jerry: The Movie
Jeff Bergman: Cartoon Network Latin America bumper
Alan Marriott: Tom and Jerry in Fists of Furry and Tom and Jerry in War of the Whiskers
Marc Silk: Tom and Jerry in War of the Whiskers (as Monster Jerry)
Dee Bradley Baker: Tom and Jerry: Blast Off to Mars and Tom and Jerry: The Fast and the Furry
Spike Brandt: The Karate Guard, Tom and Jerry: A Nutcracker Tale, Tom and Jerry Meet Sherlock Holmes, Tom and Jerry and the Wizard of Oz, Tom and Jerry: Robin Hood and His Merry Mouse, Tom and Jerry's Giant Adventure, Tom and Jerry: The Lost Dragon, Tom and Jerry: Spy Quest, Tom and Jerry: Back to Oz, and Tom and Jerry: Willy Wonka and the Chocolate Factory
Samuel Vincent: Tom and Jerry Tales and Tom and Jerry: A Nutcracker Tale
Rich Danhakl: The Tom and Jerry Show (2014 TV series)
Rick Zieff: speaking in Spike's voice in The Tom and Jerry Show (2014 TV series) episode "Cat-astrophic Failure"
André Sogliuzzo: Tom & Jerry (2021 film)
Tara Strong: (2021–present)
Jim Walker: Tom and Jerry Special Shorts (2021 series)
Eric Bauza: MultiVersus

Jerry has had a number of voice actors over the years. Ever since his debut in Puss Gets the Boot his vocal effects were provided by co-creator William Hanna during the Hanna-Barbera era. Harry E. Lang did Jerry's vocal effects and speaking voice in the shorts The Lonesome Mouse (1943) and Mouse in Manhattan (1945). Sara Berner also did vocal effects for Jerry in the short Baby Puss (1943) and voiced him in the short The Zoot Cat (1944), as well as Anchors Aweigh (1945) in a dance sequence with him and Gene Kelly. A sequence in the short The Milky Waif (1946) features Jerry and Nibbles disguising themselves as a pair of black people, in which the former is voiced by Lillian Randolph (same voice as Mammy Two Shoes). Paul Frees did Jerry's speaking voice in the shorts His Mouse Friday (1951) and Blue Cat Blues (1956). Manuel Paris did Jerry's voice in the short Mucho Mouse (1957). When the MGM cartoon studio shut down in 1957 and Gene Deitch and European animation studio Rembrandt Studio took over, he and Allen Swift did Jerry's voice during the 1961–62 era. During the Chuck Jones era in 1963–1967, his voice was provided by Mel Blanc, June Foray, Chuck Jones, and Abe Levitow. Terence Monk did his voice in the short The Cat Above and the Mouse Below (1964) and Dale McKennon did Jerry's singing voice in Cat and Dupli-cat (1967). In The Tom and Jerry Show (1975), Jerry was voiced by John Stephenson. Lou Scheimer voiced him in The Tom and Jerry Comedy Show (1980–1982). Frank Welker voiced him in Tom and Jerry Kids (1990–1993) and Tom and Jerry: The Magic Ring (2002). Dana Hill voiced Jerry's voice in Tom and Jerry: The Movie (1992). 

Other voice actors include Jeff Bergman in a Cartoon Network Latin America bumper, Alan Marriott in Tom and Jerry in Fists of Furry (2000) and Tom and Jerry in War of the Whiskers (2002), Marc Silk in Tom and Jerry in War of the Whiskers (2002; as Monster Jerry),  Dee Bradley Baker in Tom and Jerry: Blast Off to Mars (2005) and Tom and Jerry: The Fast and the Furry (2005), Spike Brandt in The Karate Guard (2005), Tom and Jerry: A Nutcracker Tale (2007), Tom and Jerry Meet Sherlock Holmes (2010), Tom and Jerry and the Wizard of Oz (2011), Tom and Jerry: Robin Hood and His Merry Mouse (2012), Tom and Jerry's Giant Adventure (2013), Tom and Jerry: The Lost Dragon (2014), Tom and Jerry: Spy Quest (2015), Tom and Jerry Back to Oz (2016), and Tom and Jerry: Willy Wonka and the Chocolate Factory (2017), Sam Vincent in Tom and Jerry Tales (2006-2008). In The Tom and Jerry Show (2014 TV series), Jerry's vocal effects are provided by the show's sound designer Rich Danhakl and archival recordings of William Hanna from the original theatrical shorts. In Tom & Jerry (2021 film), his voice was provided by André Sogliuzzo and archived recordings of William Hanna.

On November 18, 2021, it was confirmed that Eric Bauza would be voicing the character on the 2022 fighting game, MultiVersus, which establishes Jerry's original given name "Jinx" to be his middle name.

Popular culture
Tom and Jerry were planned to appear as a cameo in the deleted scene "Acme's Funeral" from the 1988 film Who Framed Roger Rabbit.

Jerry has been variously credited as Gerald "Jerry" Mouse in the video game Multiversus, and Jerome A. Mouse in the credits to their 2020 feature film. Neither of these conflicting names is considered canon, according to leading animation historian Jerry Beck.

See also
Tom and Jerry
List of Hanna-Barbera characters
Metro-Goldwyn-Mayer cartoon studio

References

Tom and Jerry characters
Animal characters in films
Animal characters in television
Film characters introduced in 1940
Fictional anthropomorphic characters
Anthropomorphic mice and rats
MGM cartoon characters
Male characters in animation
Male characters in television
Fictional mute characters
Fighting game characters
Film sidekicks
Film and television memes